True Pinball is a video game developed by Digital Illusions and published by Ocean for the PlayStation and Sega Saturn in 1996. It is an enhanced version of Pinball Illusions.

Gameplay
True Pinball is a pinball game with four pinball tables. They are the same ones featured in the later versions of Illusions, but with improved visuals and audio. Each table has been recreated in 3D and can be played either at an angle or from a top-down view.

Reception
{{Video game reviews
| rev1 = Mean Machines Sega
| rev1Score = 85% (Saturn)
| rev2 = Electronic Gaming Monthly
| rev2Score = 7/10 (Saturn)
| rev3 = Next Generation| rev3Score =  (Saturn)
| Allgame =  (PS)
}}Next Generation reviewed the Saturn version of the game, rating it three stars out of five, and stated that "True Pinball is a good video pinball game, just not a great game of pinball."Mean Machines Sega gave the Saturn version of True Pinball an overall score of 85%, expressing that it "requires skill" and is a better pinball game than Digital Pinball: Last Gladiators, further stating that it emulates the 'look and feel' of a real pinball machine. Electronic Gaming Monthly's four-person review crew gave the Saturn version of the game an overall score of seven out of ten, praising its "hi-res" graphics, and like Mean Machines Sega, EGM expressed that it emulates the 'look and feel' of a real pinball machine, with one reviewer stating that True Pinball'' is "as close to true pinball as can be".

References

1996 video games
Ocean Software games
Pinball video games
PlayStation (console) games
Sega Saturn games
Video games developed in Sweden
Video games scored by Olof Gustafsson